Ayşegül Sarıca (28 May 1935-10 March 2023) is a Turkish concert pianist, pedagogue.

Life
Ayşegül Sarıca was born into an Ottoman military family in Istanbul, Turkey in 1935. Ahmet İzzet Pasha (1864–1937), one of the last Ottoman grand viziers was her maternal grandfather. In 1955, she married Nejat Diyarbekirli and gave birth to a son named Osman and a daughter Zeynep.

Music training
Prior to the World War II, many German people had escaped from Nazi Germany and emigrated to Turkey. Gertrude Isaac, a pianist was one of them, and she gave Sarıca piano lessons when she was as young as five years old.  She continued her study in the Istanbul Municipal Conservatory. There, she became a student of Ferdi Statzer. In 1944, while she was only nine years old, she gave her first recital in Kadıköy Halkevi, Istanbul.

In 1951, she went to Paris, France, to study at the National Concervatory of Paris. Lucette Descaves and Pierre Pasquier  were her teachers. In 1953, she graduated with honors.

Music career
After 1968, she became the piano soloist of the Presidential Symphony Orchestra of Turkey. She gave concerts in such countries as  the United Kingdom, France, Italy, Germany, Austria, Belgium, Soviet Union, Hungary, former Czechoslovakia, Sweden, Norway, Finland, and Australia. In concerts, she was accompanied often by Ayla Erduran, a close friend and a violinist. Between 1991 and 2000, she served as an academic for  musicology at Bilkent University's music master program. Currently, she serves in the Dr Erol Üçer Music Research Center of Istanbul Technical University.

Awards
Sarıca received an honorable mention in the International Munich Piano Competition in 1954. In 1957, she won the special prize, "Gabriel Fauré Association," in 1959 she won one special prize "City of Paris" in the Marguerite Long–Jacques Thibaud Competition. In 1971, she was given the honorary title of State Artist by the Ministry of Culture. In 1970 she was decorated with golden "Beethoven medal" for her Beethoven interpretations by German Ministry of Culture. In 1974, she received the Chevalier de I’Ordre des Arts et des Lettres from the French Ministry of Culture. In 2006, she was awarded the “Merit of Honor" in music by the Istanbul Culture and Art Foundation."

See also
Arif Sarıca Mansion (built 1903), her gransfather's mansionas her residence.

References

External links
Turkish Culture page
 Ateş Orga page 

Living people
1935 births
Musicians from Istanbul
Turkish classical pianists
Turkish women pianists
French National Academy of Dramatic Arts alumni
Chevaliers of the Ordre des Arts et des Lettres
State Artists of Turkey
Turkish women academics
Academic staff of Bilkent University
Academic staff of Istanbul Technical University
21st-century classical pianists
Women classical pianists
21st-century women pianists